Cima di e Follicie is a mountain in the department of Haute-Corse on the island of Corsica, France.
It is in the Monte Stello massif on Cap Corse.

Location

The peak of Cima di e Follicie is just northeast of the intersection of the boundaries of the communes of Olcani to the south, Ogliastro to the west and Sisco to the east.
It is southeast of the village of Canari and west of the town of Sisco.

Physical

It looks over the Albo beach and Canelle point to the west and the sea around Sisco to the east.

Cime di e Follicie consists of Cretaceous ophiolites that were formed during the Alpine orogeny.

Hiking

The hike from the village of Olcani climbs for almost .
At first it follows a track that was meant to cross the cape but has never been paved, which climbs steeply at times to a small chapel in the San Giovanni pass, from where the track leads on to Sisco.
A marked path leads towards the Pruberzulu rock, and from there to the summit.

Gallery

Notes

Sources

Mountains of Haute-Corse